Cameron Richard Klassen (born 16 August 1986) is a Namibian rugby union player, currently playing with the Namibia national team and the  in the South African Currie Cup competition. His regular position is scrum-half.

Rugby career

Klassen was born in Windhoek (then in South-West Africa, but part of modern-day Namibia).

References

External links
 

1986 births
Living people
Namibia international rugby union players
Namibian rugby union players
Rugby union players from Windhoek
Rugby union scrum-halves